The  is a bus terminal situated in Itako, Ibaraki, Japan. It is used by the Kantō Railway, Keisei Bus and JR Bus Kantō, among others.

Overview
The bus terminal is located near the Itako interchange on the Higashi-Kantō Expressway. The terminal was moved to the present spot in 2002 because the users had increased in number. There is an adjacent parking area.

There are 5 highway buses (For the direct of Tokyo Station, Narita Airport, Haneda Airport, Kaihinmakuhari Station, Tokyo Disney Resort and Odaiba) and two route bus (bound to Kashima and Namegata).

The Suigo-Itako Ayame Festival is held annually in Itako from late May to late June. The Suigo-Itako Ayame Garden, where the festival is held, is located near the terminal.

Buses

Highway buses 
An IC card (Pasmo and Suica) can be used on highway buses except Roze Liner.

Route buses
An IC card (Pasmo and Suica) can be used on route buses except Ikeda Kōtsū.

Nearby stations and ports
Nobukata Station and Itako Station, both on the Kashima Line, are a respective 35 and 40 minutes on foot from the bus terminal. 50 minute's walk will bring from the terminal to Itako Port. Passengers are able to travel from this port to Tsuchiura Station via ferry.

See also 
Suigō-Tsukuba Quasi-National Park

References

External links
 Official website

Bus stations in Japan
Itako, Ibaraki
Buildings and structures in Ibaraki Prefecture
Transport in Ibaraki Prefecture